Jung Woo-seok (Hanja: 鄭禹奭; born January 31, 1998), also known by the mononym Wooseok, is a South Korean rapper, singer, songwriter, model and composer. He debuted as a member of the South Korean boy group Pentagon in October 2016 and also formed a duo with Lai Kuan-lin as Wooseok X Kuanlin in March 2019, under Cube Entertainment.

Early life and education 
Wooseok was born in Gwangju, South Korea on January 31, 1998. In 2017, he graduated from the School of Performing Arts in Seoul. When he was a child, he played violin and piano, and he regularly participated in competitions and won awards.

Career

2016–present: Debut with Pentagon, Wooseok X Kuanlin, and solo activities 
Wooseok participated in Mnet's reality survival program, Pentagon Maker. He made his official debut with Pentagon on October 10, 2016 with the song "Gorilla" from their self-titled EP.

In 2017, Wooseok co-wrote the Produce 101 Season 2 hit song "Never" and Wanna One's debut title track, "Energetic" together with Pentagon's leader Hui. Later in September, Wooseok made a cameo with other members of Pentagon as the idol group Asgard in the drama Hello, My Twenties! 2. He appeared in the music video of labelmate Jeon So-yeon's debut song "Jelly" in November.

On March 24, 2018 Wooseok debuted as a model during 2018 F/W Hera Seoul Fashion Week for the designer brand R.Shemiste. On June 19, he was featured on the song "Ain't No Time" by Kim Dong-han from Kim's debut EP D-Day.

On February 22, 2019, Cube Entertainment announced that Wooseok would be debuting in a new unit project alongside labelmate and former Wanna One member Lai Kuan-lin. The unit, Wooseok X Kuanlin, made their debut on March 11, 2019 with the title track "I'm A Star" and debut extended play, 9801. The EP contains two solo songs, "Always Difficult Always Beautiful" and "Domino", both of which were co-written and co-produced by Wooseok.

In 2020, Wooseok was cast in tvN's new variety show, Decoding Meow alongside Yoo Seon-ho which premiered on January 5. On January 14, Wooseok was featured in Jeong Young-eun's "Fine Day", and he participated in the song's lyrics. In October, Wooseok was confirmed as a contestant on the rap competition program Show Me The Money 9. During the 60 Second Team Trials, he received one pass and three fails from the producers, and was subsequently eliminated from the show.

On January 20, 2021, Wooseok was confirmed to make his web drama debut as the lead in Dingo Music's Fling at Convenience Store. In February, he starred in the web drama Nickname Pine Leaf for the SBS YouTube channel , where he plays two different versions of himself: PD Jung Seok-woo and Pentagon's Wooseok. In July, he was cast as the lead in his second Dingo Music web drama Those Who Want to Catch.

Discography

Songwriting and credits

Filmography

Drama

Web series

Variety show

References

External links

1998 births
21st-century South Korean male singers
Cube Entertainment artists
Living people
People from Gwangju
Pentagon (South Korean band) members
South Korean male rappers
South Korean male idols
South Korean male singer-songwriters
South Korean hip hop record producers
South Korean male web series actors
School of Performing Arts Seoul alumni
Wooseok